Bangor RFC is a Northern Irish rugby union club from Bangor, County Down, playing in Division 2C of the All-Ireland League.

History
The club was founded in 1885 and enjoyed senior status between 1924 and the Second World War. The club returned to junior rugby after the war. Historically having played at Ward Park, leased from Bangor Borough Council, in 1968 the club purchased eleven acres of land on the southern outskirts of Bangor and opened a new ground named Upritchard Park (after chairman Joe Upritchard) in September 1969, coinciding with the regaining of senior status. Over the next 20 years, Bangor became one of the top senior clubs in Ulster, culminating in the 1981-82 season, when it won the treble of Ulster Senior League, Ulster Senior Cup and its own floodlit competition, the Boston Cup. Bangor were inaugural members of the All-Ireland League in 1990, but the club went into decline and was relegated back into junior rugby in 2002. In 2016, however, the club regained senior status on promotion back to the All-Ireland League. Since 1972, the club has been joined with Bangor Cricket Club as Bangor Rugby Football and Cricket Club.

Notable players
 British and Irish Lions
 Richard Milliken

Three Bangor players – Roger Clegg, Billy McCombe and Richard Milliken – represented Ireland in the 1975 Five Nations Championship.

 Joeli Veitayaki

Honours
Ulster Senior Cup: 3
 1979-80, 1981–82, 1985–86
Ulster Senior League: 7
 1929-30, 1974–75, 1976–77, 1980–81, 1981–82, 1982–83, 1987–88
Ulster Towns Cup: 13
 1903-04, 1905–06, 1908–09, 1919–20, 1922–23, 1929–30, 1945–46, 1955–56, 1967–68, 1968–69, †1971-72, †1974-75, 2015–16
Ulster Junior Cup: 1
 2015-16
† Won by 2nd XV

References

External links
Club web site

Rugby union clubs in County Down
Senior Irish rugby clubs (Ulster)